August Wilhelm Knoch (June 8, 1742 – June 2, 1818) was a German naturalist born in Braunschweig. He was a professor of physics at Collegium Carolinum.

He studied theology at the University of Leipzig. In 1775 he was hired as a caretaker at the Collegium Carolinum, during which time his interests turned to natural sciences. In 1789 he became a professor of physics. 

He was the author of the following works in entomology:
 Beyträge zur Insektengeschichte Leipzig (Schwickert). three volumes 1781, 1782, 1783. 
 Neue Beyträge zur Insectenkunde Leipzig (Schwickert) 1801.

References
Biographical etymology of marine organism names. K
 Parts of this article are based on a translation of the equivalent article from the German Wikipedia.

External links
Zoologica GDZ

1742 births
1818 deaths
German naturalists
German entomologists
Scientists from Braunschweig
People from Brunswick-Lüneburg
Academic staff of the Technical University of Braunschweig